The Marshall Democrat-News is a local newspaper published in Marshall, Missouri, serving Saline County.  The paper is published Monday through Friday and reports a circulation of 3,063.

References

External links
 

Newspapers published in Missouri
Saline County, Missouri